Oyster Creek is a  tributary of Barnegat Bay in southeastern New Jersey in the United States.

The Oyster Creek Nuclear Generating Station is located on an  site at Forked River. It opened in 1969 and was closed down on September 17, 2018.

See also
List of rivers of New Jersey

References

External links
 - Mouth

Rivers of Ocean County, New Jersey
Rivers in the Pine Barrens (New Jersey)
Rivers of New Jersey
Tributaries of Barnegat Bay